Juari Edwards (born 28 September 1982) is an Antiguan cricketer. He played in two Twenty20 matches for Antigua and Barbuda in 2008, and one first-class match for the Leeward Islands in 2011.

See also
 List of Leeward Islands first-class cricketers

References

External links
 

1982 births
Living people
Antigua and Barbuda cricketers
Leeward Islands cricketers